Thorild may refer to:

Torhild, a given name (including a list of people with the name)
Thomas Thorild (1759–1808), Swedish poet, critic, feminist and philosopher

See also
 Thorhild, Alberta